Jüri Kurul may refer to:
 Jüri Kurul (politician) (1872–1937), Estonian politician
 Jüri Kurul (rower) (1924–2005), Estonian rower